Escape 2 Mars is the second solo studio album by American rapper Gift of Gab. It was released on Cornerstone R.A.S. on November 3, 2009.

Critical reception
At Metacritic, which assigns a weighted average score out of 100 to reviews from mainstream critics, Escape 2 Mars received an average score of 76% based on 11 reviews, indicating "generally favorable reviews".

Steve Juon of RapReviews.com named it the best album of 2009.

Track listing

References

External links
 

2009 albums
Gift of Gab (rapper) albums